Chris Silva Obame Correia Silva (born September 19, 1996) is a Gabonese professional basketball player for the College Park Skyhawks of the NBA G League. He played college basketball for the South Carolina Gamecocks.

Early life
Silva was born in Gabon. His father, who played for the Gabon men's national basketball team, helped arrange to send Silva to the United States as a teenager to pursue a professional basketball career.

In September 2012, when Silva was 15 years old, he arrived in the United States for the first time to enroll at Roselle Catholic High School in New Jersey. Though he knew no English and had no experience playing organized basketball, he told assistant basketball coach Tommy Sacks, "Coach, I go NBA." Sacks later commented, "His ceiling is so high, one of the highest I've ever seen, because all he wants to do is get better. He wants to live in the weight room. He wants to run on his own. He wants to work out. He wants to get shots up."

High school career
Initially, with the Roselle Catholic basketball team, Silva was not aware of the rules of the game. In his senior season, his team won the state championship. Silva drew interest from college basketball programs such as Seton Hall and Rhode Island, and eventually signed with the South Carolina Gamecocks. Silva said, "That's a great school, great coaches. I like everything about it, the education, the support they give to players after their career—everything."

College career
In 2017 Silva started all 37 games on the Gamecocks team that reached the Final Four. In 2018 Silva won SEC Co-Defensive player of the year, was First-team All-SEC and was named to the All-Defensive team. He averaged 14.3 points and 8 rebounds per game as a junior and shot 46.7 percent from the floor. Following the season he declared for the NBA draft but did not hire an agent. Silva was not invited to the NBA combine and decided to return to South Carolina.

Professional career

Miami Heat (2019–2021)
Silva was signed by the Miami Heat on July 11, 2019. On October 19, the Heat converted his deal to a two-way contract with their NBA G League affiliate, the Sioux Falls Skyforce. On October 23, Silva made his NBA debut, coming off the bench in a 120–101 win over the Memphis Grizzlies. He finished with eight points, six rebounds, and three blocks. On January 15, 2020, Silva signed a standard NBA contract with the Heat. On January 23, Silva was assigned to the Sioux Falls Skyforce. On January 26, Silva was brought back up to the Miami Heat. The Heat reached the 2020 NBA Finals, but lost in 6 games to the Los Angeles Lakers.

Sacramento Kings (2021)
On March 25, 2021, Silva and Maurice Harkless were traded to the Sacramento Kings in exchange for Nemanja Bjelica. On April 28, he was waived by the Kings.

Iowa Wolves (2021)
On September 20, 2021, Silva signed with the Minnesota Timberwolves. However, he was waived prior to the start of the season. On October 26, he signed with the Iowa Wolves. In 12 games, he averaged 15.1 points, 9.6 rebounds, 1.8 assists and 0.8 blocks, leading the Wolves in rebounds per game and blocks per game.

Minnesota Timberwolves (2021)
On December 21, 2021, Silva signed a 10-day contract with the Minnesota Timberwolves.

Return to Miami (2021–2022)
On December 31, 2021, Silva signed a 10-day contract with the Miami Heat. On January 10, 2022, he signed a second 10-day contract. Silva signed a third 10-day contract with the Heat on January 21. He signed a fourth 10-day contract with the Heat on January 31.

Return to Iowa (2022)
He returned to the Iowa Wolves on February 9.

College Park Skyhawks (2022–2023)
On November 3, 2022, Silva was named to the opening night roster for the College Park Skyhawks.

Dallas Mavericks (2023)
On January 31, 2023, the Dallas Mavericks announced that they had signed Silva to a 10-day contract. He signed a second 10-day contract with the team on February 10, but was waived just four days later, in order for the team to sign Justin Holiday instead.

Return to College Park (2023–present)
On February 14, 2023, Silva was reacquired by the College Park Skyhawks.

National team career
On June 11, 2015, Silva was named to the Gabon national basketball team's preliminary squad for the AfroBasket 2015 by head coach Thierry Bouanga. It was considered a possibility that he would debut alongside ex-NBA player Stéphane Lasme. Silva would participate in a three-week training camp in Libreville in July.

Career statistics

NBA

Regular season

|-
| style="text-align:left;"| 
| style="text-align:left;"| Miami
| 44 || 0 || 7.9 || .615 || .000 || .673 || 2.9 || .5 || .2 || .5 || 3.0
|-
| style="text-align:left;"| 
| style="text-align:left;"| Miami
| 11 || 0 || 7.5 || .692 || 1.000 || .773 || 2.3 || .5 || .1 || .5 || 2.7
|-
| style="text-align:left;"| 
| style="text-align:left;"| Sacramento
| 4 || 0 || 2.3 || .333 || — || — || .5 || .0 || .0 || .3 || .5
|-
| style="text-align:left;"| 
| style="text-align:left;"| Minnesota
| 1 || 0 || 3.0 || — || — || — || 1.0 || .0 || .0 || .3 || .0
|-
| style="text-align:left;"| 
| style="text-align:left;"| Miami
| 9 || 0 || 9.8 || .533 || — || .833 || 3.9 || .8 || .0 || .1 || 2.9
|-
| style="text-align:left;"| 
| style="text-align:left;"| Dallas
| 1 || 0 || 3.0 || 1.000 || — || — || .0 || .0 || .0 || .0 || 2.0
|- class="sortbottom"
| style="text-align:center;" colspan="2"| Career
| 70 || 0 || 7.6 || .609 || .250 || .707 || 2.7 || .5 || .1 || .4 || 2.8

College

|-
| style="text-align:left;"|2015–16
| style="text-align:left;"|South Carolina
| 32 || 6 || 13.3 || .482 ||  || .609 || 4.5 || .2 || .4 || .9 || 5.4
|-
| style="text-align:left;"|2016–17
| style="text-align:left;"|South Carolina
| 37 || 37 || 20.9 || .524 || .000 || .749 || 6.1 || .4 || .6 || 1.4 || 10.2
|-
| style="text-align:left;"|2017–18
| style="text-align:left;"|South Carolina
| 33 || 33 || 25.8 || .467 || .417 || .753 || 8.0 || 1.2 || .6 || 1.4 || 14.3
|-
| style="text-align:left;"|2018–19
| style="text-align:left;"|South Carolina
| 32 || 32 || 26.7 || .508 || .500 || .744 || 7.6 || .9 || .9 || 1.9 || 15.2
|- class="sortbottom"
| style="text-align:center;" colspan="2"|Career
| 134 || 108 || 21.7 || .497 || .475 || .729 || 6.5 || .7 || .6 || 1.4 || 11.3

References

External links

 South Carolina Gamecocks bio

1996 births
Living people
21st-century Gabonese people
Basketball players from New Jersey
College Park Skyhawks players
Dallas Mavericks players
Expatriate basketball people in the United States
Gabonese expatriate sportspeople in the United States
Gabonese men's basketball players
Iowa Wolves players
Miami Heat players
Minnesota Timberwolves players
Power forwards (basketball)
Roselle Catholic High School alumni
Sacramento Kings players
Sioux Falls Skyforce players
South Carolina Gamecocks men's basketball players
Sportspeople from Libreville
Undrafted National Basketball Association players